In the Burmese language, the term mont translates to "snack", and refers to a wide variety of prepared foods, ranging from sweet desserts to savory food items that may be cooked by steaming, baking, frying, deep-frying, or boiling. Foods made from wheat or rice flour are generally called mont, but the term may also refer to certain varieties of noodle dishes, such as mohinga. Burmese mont are typically eaten with tea during breakfast or afternoon tea time.

Each variety of mont is designated by a descriptive word or phrase that precedes or follows the word mont, such as htoe mont or mont lone yay baw.

In Burmese, the term mont is not limited to Burmese cuisine: it applies equally to items as varied as Western-style breads ( or paung mont), Chinese moon cakes ( or la mont), ice cream ( or yay ge mont) and tinned biscuits ( or mont thitta).

Ingredients

Lower-amylose rice varieties are commonly used as a key ingredient in Burmese mont. Sweet Burmese mont are generally less sweet than counterparts in other parts of Southeast Asia, instead deriving their natural sweetness from constituent ingredients (e.g., grated coconut, coconut milk, glutinous rice, etc.).

Varieties

There is a nearly endless variety of named dishes with the prefix or suffix mont. What follows is a list of the most typical traditional varieties of mont.

Noodles
Noodle dishes made with fresh rice vermicelli, which is called mont phat, are typically prefixed with the term mont, including:

  – savory noodle soup made in a fish broth
  – a variety of regional dishes throughout Myanmar that use mont phat
  - a noodle salad from Mandalay that uses thick round rice noodles

Savory snacks

  – curry puff
  – seasonal delicacy made with glutinous rice, coconut, peanuts, ginger, and sesame
  – stuffed savory crepe
  – steamed rice flour slivers sprinkled with roasted sesame seeds, salt, and coconut shavings
  or mont salin daung – pancake made of rice flour and palm sugar batter
  – glutinous rice crisps
 
  – rice flour griddle cake
  – pretzel-like snack made of rice and bean flour
  – deep-fried fish crackers
  – paper-thin crisp pancake of rice batter

Desserts

 Aung Bala – rice pancake topped with syrup
  – pancake made of rice flour, palm sugar, coconut chips, and peanuts, garnished with poppy seeds
 Bi mont – fried turnover stuffed with a savory filling, similar to an empanada
  – an Indian sweetmeat
  – a regional delicacy from Pathein
  – steamed rice cake similar to Chinese fa gao
  – pudding made of glutinous rice, sugar, coconut and oil
  – steamed purple rice cakes colored with kauk hlaing ti blossoms
 
  – glutinous rice patty with coconut shavings
  – folded pancake made with rice flour, palm sugar, and coconut, similar to Thai khanom bueang
  – jelly made with coconut milk
  – Burmese-style dairy desserts, similar to ras malai
  – translucent rice pudding similar to Karachi halwa
  – puffed grains of early ripened glutinous rice congealed into a mass with palm sugar syrup, similar to Chinese sachima
  steamed rice cakes, similar to Indonesian putu piring
 
 
  – steamed glutinous rice cake garnished with coconut shavings
  - a steamed golden rice cake similar to the bika ambon, introduced by the Sino-Burmese
  - a layered pudding introduced by the Sino-Burmese
  or  - a multi-layered jelly pudding introduced by the Sino-Burmese
 
  or  – small balls of boiled glutinous rice in palm sugar syrup
  or mont gyo thwin – rice flour strings, similar to Indian jalebi
 Mont kywe leit – glutinous rice and rice flour snack garnished with sesame seeds, fried garlic, and coconut shavings
  – rice flour pudding sweetened with jaggery
  - Burmese-style cendol
  – glutinous rice donuts
 
  – steamed sweet rice dumplings with sweet fillings, similar to Chinese tangyuan
  kyaw - fried sweet rice dumplings with sweet fillings, similar to Chinese jian dui
  – griddle cake of course rice, served with peas or jaggery
  – fine rice flour mixed with palm sugar boiled into a thick fudge
  – steamed rice flour jelly
  – steamed sticky rice dumplings, similar to Chinese zongzi
 Mont pya lu – toasted rice and sugar snack, similar to Filipino espasol
  – batter cake shaped like a honeycomb, made of rice flour with or without palm sugar syrup
  – spongy cake of rice flour and palm sugar batter shaped like a vespiary

  – steamed rice cake
  – rice flour griddle cake
  – griddle cake of rice flour covered with coconut shreds, palm sugar syrup and folded
  – fried sweet pancakes made from glutinous rice
  – glutinous rice flakes
  – Indian shortbread cookies
  - steamed glutinous rice baked with coconut milk (also called )
  – sago with coconut milk
  – confection of roasted glutinous rice flour mixed with sugar and coconut shreds
  – a cake made with grated cassava, similar to Filipino cassava cake
  – semolina pudding cake made with sugar, coconut, and butter
  – a baked sweet, made from millet, raisins, coconut and butter
 
  (. ) – brown glutinous rice cake sweetened with jaggery
 
  – sago pudding sweetened with coconut milk and condensed milk

See also

 Burmese cuisine
 Bánh, a similar class of Vietnamese snacks
 Kue, a similar class of Indonesian snacks
Kuih, a similar class of Malaysian and Singaporean snacks
Kakanin, a similar class of Filipino snacks

References

Burmese cuisine
Burmese desserts and snacks